The Ngwo Pine Forest a pine forest near the center of Enugu. The forest hosts a limestone cave sculpted  with a small waterfall that forms a shallow pool at the bed of the cave. The Ngwo Pine Forest is used as a recreational area to picnic.

References 

Enugu State
Tourist attractions in Nigeria